Jodocus Hondius (Latinized version of his Dutch name: Joost de Hondt) (17 October 1563 – 12 February 1612) was a Flemish and Dutch engraver and cartographer. He is sometimes called Jodocus Hondius the Elder to distinguish him from his son Jodocus Hondius II. Hondius is best known for his early maps of the New World and Europe, for re-establishing the reputation of the work of Gerard Mercator, and for his portraits of Francis Drake. He inherited and republished the plates of Mercator, thus reviving his legacy, also making sure to include independent revisions to his work. One of the notable figures in the Golden Age of Dutch cartography (c. 1570s–1670s), he helped establish Amsterdam as the center of cartography in Europe in the 17th century.

Biography 

Hondius was born in Wakken and grew up in Ghent. In his early years he established himself as an engraver, instrument maker and globe maker. In 1584 he moved to London with his sister Jacomina to escape religious difficulties in Flanders. In 1587 in London he married Colette van den Keere, daughter of Hendrik, an engraver of metal type, and collaborated with her brother Pieter, also a mapmaker and engraver.

While in England, Hondius was instrumental in publicizing the work of Francis Drake, who had made a circumnavigation of the world in the late 1570s. In particular, in 1589 Hondius produced a now famous map of the bay of New Albion, where Drake briefly established a settlement on the west coast of North America. Hondius's map was based on journal and eyewitness accounts of the trip and has long fuelled speculation about the precise location of Drake's landing, now thought to be at Drakes Estero in California. Hondius is also thought to be the artist of several well-known portraits of Drake that are now in the National Portrait Gallery in London. Also Hondius had engraved charts in the Mariners Mirrour (1588) and the first English globes, those of Emery Molynex completed in 1592.

In 1593 he, accompanied his wife and Pieter van der Keere, moved to Amsterdam where he remained until the end of his life. In co-operation with the Amsterdam publisher Cornelis Claesz in 1604 he purchased the plates of Gerard Mercator's Atlas from Mercator's grandson. Mercator's work had languished in comparison to the rival Theatrum Orbis Terrarum by Ortelius. Hondius republished Mercator's work with 36 additional maps (which were added to 107 original maps), including several which he himself had produced. Despite the addition of his own contributions, Hondius gave Mercator full credit as the author of the work, listing himself as the publisher. Hondius's new edition of Mercator's work was a great success, selling out after a year. Hondius later published a second edition, as well as a pocket version Atlas Minor. The maps have since become known as the "Mercator/Hondius series". Hondius was a cousin of Abraham Goos, and he taught Goos mapmaking and engraving.

In the French edition of the Atlas Minor we find one of the first instances of a thematic map using map symbols. This is a map entitled Designatio orbis christiani (1607) showing the dispersion of major religions.

Hondius used copper plates to print John Speed's atlas The Theatre of the Empire of Great Britaine, which was published in 1611/2.

Hondius died, aged 48 (1612), in Amsterdam. After his death, his publishing work in Amsterdam was continued by his widow, two sons, Jodocus II and Henricus, and son-in-law Johannes Janssonius, whose name appears on the Atlas as co-publisher after 1633. Eventually, starting with the first 1606 edition in Latin, about 50 editions of the Atlas were released in the main European languages. In the Islamic world, the atlas was partially translated by the Turkish scholar Kâtip Çelebi. The series is sometimes called the "Mercator/Hondius/Janssonius" series because of Janssonius's later contributions.

The Hondius Inlet in Antarctica is named after Jodocus Hondius.

Portrayal of globes in Vermeer's paintings
Scholars have argued that the globes depicted in celebrated 17th-century painter Johannes Vermeer's 1668 The Astronomer and 1669 The Geographer were based on a pair of globes by Hondius. Close inspection of these two globes reveals striking similarities to a pair of globes made in 1618 by Hondius. The globes were made as pendants, one depicting the earth while the other depicted the constellations. In Vermeer's The Astronomer the scholar consults a version of Hondius' celestial globe and in The Geographer Hondius' terrestrial globe can be seen placed atop the back cabinet. A version of Hondius' celestial globe can be found in the Scheepvaartmuseum in Amsterdam and the terrestrial globe can be found in The Hispanic Society Museum & Library in New York City.

See also
 Theatrum artis scribendi

References

Literature
 Peter van der Krogt (ed.): Koeman's atlantes Neerlandici, Vol. 1: The folio atlases published by Gerard Mercator, Jodocus Hondius, Henricus Hondius, Johannes Janssonius and their successors, 't Goy-Houten 1997,

External links 

 
 

16th-century engravers
16th-century Flemish cartographers
16th-century Dutch cartographers
17th-century Dutch cartographers
Calligraphers from the Northern Netherlands
17th-century engravers
1563 births
1612 deaths
Artists from Amsterdam
Dutch celestial cartography in the Age of Discovery
Astronomy in the Dutch Republic
Flemish engravers
Scientists from Ghent
Artists from Ghent